In algebraic geometry, a Sarti surface is a degree-12 nodal surface with 600 nodes, found by . The maximal possible number of nodes of a degree-12 surface is not known (as of 2015), though Yoichi Miyaoka showed that it is at most 645.

Sarti has also found sextic, octic and dodectic nodal surfaces with high numbers of nodes and high degrees of symmetry.

See also
Nodal surface

References

External links

Algebraic surfaces
Complex surfaces